The NWA Gulf Coast Tag Team Championship was the main tag team championship in Gulf Coast Championship Wrestling or NWA Gulf Coast. The Gulf Coast tag team championship is the successor for GCCW's version of the NWA Southern Tag Team Championship that was promoted in the Tennessee, Alabama, Florida and Mississippi region from 1955 until 1967 where it was replaced by the "NWA Gulf Coast Tag Team Championship. The Gulf Coast Tag Team championship was promoted from 1967 until 1978 where Southeast Championship Wrestling took control of the title renaming in back to the "NWA Southern Tag Team Championship" and promoted it in its "Southern Division" in 1978 and 1979. In 1980 the Southern Division was abandoned and the Northern Division of the NWA Southern Tag Team Championship became the main title of SECW.

Title history
[...] Means champion lineage is uncertain at this period in time
 means "No later than"

NWA Southern Tag Team Championship (Gulf Coast version)

NWA Gulf Coast Tag Team Championship

NWA Southern Tag Team Championship (Southern Division)

The following teams are also credited with holding the NWA Southern Tag Team championship but no specific time period has been documented.

Ricky Gibson and Robert Gibson
Rip Tyler and Eddie Sullivan
Ron Fuller and Robert Fuller
Bob Armstrong and Charlie Cook
Ron Fuller and Terry Gibbs

See also
Gulf Coast Championship Wrestling / Southeast Championship Wrestling
National Wrestling Alliance

References

National Wrestling Alliance championships
Continental Championship Wrestling championships
Tag team wrestling championships
Regional professional wrestling championships